Japanese nuclear disaster can refer to:

 The atomic bombing of Hiroshima and Nagasaki, in 1945, at the end of World War II, see Atomic bombings of Hiroshima and Nagasaki
 The nuclear accidents at Fukushima Daiichi following the 2011 Tōhoku earthquake and tsunami, see Fukushima Daiichi nuclear disaster

See also
 List of Japanese nuclear incidents